Kumimanu is an extinct genus of giant penguin, which lived around 60 to 56 million years ago. The type species is K. biceae, which arose after the extinction of the non-avian dinosaurs. Fossils were found in New Zealand, and the discovery was announced in December 2017. A second species, Kumimanu fordycei, was named in February 2023.

General information 
The order Sphenisciformes refers to all living and extinct penguin species. In 2017 an article on one of the largest and oldest species of the order herewith discovered was published. It was discovered at Hampden Beach in the Otago region of New Zealand. This organism is named Kumimanu biceae, of which the genus name translates from Māori as "monster bird", while the specific name honours the nickname of the mother one of the authors. This is a particularly significant discovery because the fossil is fifty-five million years old — meaning it lived in the Paleocene era — which is many million years older than all other previously found remains of penguins which reached 'giant' sizes, and thus the third or fourth oldest penguin known (pending new publications). Therefore, it allows scientists to better understand the evolution of penguins.

Kumimanu fordycei is the largest known living or extinct penguin species, with an estimated weight of 148 to 159.7 kg. The species name honours palaeontologist Ewan Fordyce.

Discovery and analysis 
The fossils were found by a group of researchers from New Zealand in Otago, on the South Island of New Zealand. The fossils are from the Paleocene Waipara Greensand formation. The fossils were studied by a New Zealand and German team, led by Gerald Mayr of the Senckenberg Research Institute and Natural History Museum. He was the lead author of an article on the subject published online in December 2017.

Kumimanu fordycei is named from a large specimen from the late Palaeocene Moeraki Formation, dating to 55.5-59.5 million years ago. It was found by palaeontologist Alan Tennyson in 2017.

Ecology and behavior 
Kumimanu biceae lived in New Zealand, which was subtropical during much of the Paleocene era. There were many organisms in these waters including sea turtles and various fishes. K. biceae were likely similar to modern-day penguins in the way they lived. However, these “monster birds” were likely able to consume larger prey due to their size.

See also 
 Kairuku
 Extinction event

References 

 Jadwiszczak, Piotr, et al. “Redescription Of Crossvallia Unienwillia: The Only Paleocene Antarctic Penguin.” Ameghiniana, vol. 50, no. 6, 2013, pp. 545–553., doi:10.5710/amgh.09.10.2013.1058"
 "Ancient Mega-Penguin Reached Human Height"
 Malcolm Ritter: "Ancient penguin was as big as a (human) Pittsburgh Penguin", retrieved 15 December 2017. (Note: The title refers to the Pittsburgh Penguins ice hockey team).

Paleogene birds of Oceania
Extinct birds of New Zealand
Extinct penguins
Fossils of New Zealand
Fossil taxa described in 2017
Prehistoric bird genera
Extinct monotypic bird genera